Harris Valley is a valley just east of Coxcomb Peak in the Allan Hills of Victoria Land, Antarctica. It was reconnoitered by the New Zealand Antarctic Research Program Allan Hills Expedition (1964), who gave the name after Professor T.M. Harris who has made outstanding contributions to Mesozoic paleobotany.

References

Valleys of Oates Land